The Old Forge School District is a diminutive, suburban, public school district serving the municipality of Old Forge, Pennsylvania, a suburb of Scranton in Lackawanna County. The district is one of the 500 public school districts of Pennsylvania. The district encompasses . According to 2000 federal census data, it served a resident population of 8,798. By 2010, the district's population declined to 8,310 people. The educational attainment levels for the Old Forge School District population (25 years old and over) were 89.4% high school graduates and 22.6% college graduates.

According to the Pennsylvania Budget and Policy Center, 41.7% of the district's pupils lived at 185% or below the Federal Poverty level as shown by their eligibility for the federal free or reduced price school meal programs in 2012. In 2009, the Old Forge School District residents' per capita income was $19,228, while the median family income was just $46,152. In Lackawanna County, the median household income was $43,673. In the Commonwealth, the median family income was $49,501  and the United States median family income was $49,445, in 2010.

Old Forge School District has a cooperative agreement with Luzerne County Community College.

Old Forge School District operates two schools: Old Forge Elementary School (K–6th) and Old Forge Junior Senior High School (7th-12th).
The Northeastern Educational Intermediate Unit IU19 provides the district with a wide variety of services like specialized education for disabled students and hearing, speech and visual disability services and professional development for staff and faculty. Old Forge High School  students do not have access to Career Technology Center of Lackawanna County which is the region's vocational technical school.

History

Since 1910, the town of Old Forge has had its own school district. Originally, there were several elementary schools throughout Old Forge serving each section of town, such as Central, Lawrenceville, Moosic Road, Sussex, Sibley, and Rendham. The high school was located on South Main Street (the site of the recently closed Ace Hardware, now Driscoll's), which housed grades 9–12. A separate building in the rear of the main high school served as another elementary school and a gymnasium. This structure was destroyed by fire in the late 1950s.

In 1956, it was decided that all schools should be consolidated into one large building. Many feel that it was the building of a new school that saved Old Forge from the growing trend of jointures that was taking place throughout the area in the 1960s and 1970s. Groundbreaking began on July 21, 1956, at the current site located on Marion Street. The new school opened for the 1960–1961 school year and is still in use to this day, receiving major renovations during the 1990s. All the old schools have since been demolished.

Extracurriculars
Old Forge School District offers a variety of clubs, activities and sports.

Sports
The district funds:
Varsity

Boys
Baseball - AA
Basketball- AA
Football - A
Golf - AA
Soccer - AA

Girls
Basketball - AA
Golf - AA
Softball - AA

Junior high school sports

Boys
Baseball
Basketball
Cross country
Football
Golf
Soccer

Girls
Basketball
Softball 

According to PIAA directory July 2014

History
The Old Forge Blue Devils of Old Forge High School have a long, rich history in the area of sports. During the 1950s and 1960s, Old Forge dominated the area in football and basketball, winning several league championships and conference titles. During the 1950s, Old Forge compiled the highest winning percentage for football in the entire state.

The school has been to the state championship game five times and has won twice. In 1932, Old Forge beat St. Vincent High from Erie 24-19 for the state basketball championship. At the time, schools were not divided by class, thus there was only one state champion in the entire state. Sixty years later in 1992, Old Forge won the Class "AA" state championship in baseball by beating Ridgway 15–5. In 2009, the girls softball team reached the state championship game, only to lose 1–0 to Curwensville. In the 2013–2014 school year, the Old Forge football team and the girls basketball team both reached the state finals, with the girls basketball team repeating a trip to the state finals in the 2014–2015 season.

Old Forge has had a long-standing rival with neighboring town Taylor that goes back to 1939 when Old Forge beat the Taylor Trojans 2–0 in the first meeting of the two teams on the football field. Thus began the "Old Forge-Taylor Football Rivalry". A tradition began in 1940 of the two teams meeting on Thanksgiving Day. This continued until 1974. The rivalry was on hiatus from 1988 until 2000, when the two teams met renewing the heated rivalry between the two neighboring towns.

Below is a partial list of the achievements made in basketball, football and baseball/softball.

Basketball

Football

Baseball/softball

References

School districts in Lackawanna County, Pennsylvania
School districts established in 1910